Men at Work is an American sitcom that aired on TBS. The series was created by Breckin Meyer and stars Danny Masterson, Michael Cassidy, Adam Busch, James Lesure, and Meredith Hagner. The series premiered on May 24, 2012.

On May 11, 2014, TBS canceled Men at Work after three seasons.

Synopsis
The series follows Milo (Danny Masterson), a man who recently ended his relationship with his girlfriend, Lisa, and tries to re-enter the dating scene with the help of his three best friends/co-workers, Tyler, Gibbs, and Neal (Michael Cassidy, James Lesure, Adam Busch).  Neal is the only one who has a girlfriend, Amy (Meredith Hagner). Together, the four friends help each other navigate through relationships, friendship and working together in New York City at the same magazine, Full Steam. The gang mainly hangs out at the diner or at the workplace.

Cast and characters

Main cast
 Danny Masterson as Milo Foster
 James Lesure as Gibbs
 Michael Cassidy as Tyler Mitchell
 Adam Busch as Neal Bradford
 Meredith Hagner as Amy Jordan (seasons 1–2; recurring, season 3)

Recurring cast
 J. K. Simmons as P.J. Jordan, Owner of Full Steam Magazine and Amy's father
 Joel David Moore as Doug, the season one chief editor of Full Steam Magazine
 Stephanie Lemelin as Rachel, Tyler's ex-girlfriend that once had a threesome with Gibbs
 Amy Smart as Lisa, Milo's ex-girlfriend
 Peri Gilpin as Alex, the season two chief editor of Full Steam Magazine
 Sarah Wright as Molly, Milo's ex-girlfriend
 David Krumholtz as Myron, the season three (current) editor Full Steam magazine
 Marsha Thomason as Selena
 Kelen Coleman as Jude

Episodes

Development and production
The pilot appeared on TBS's development slate in May 2011. The series was created by Breckin Meyer, who also serves as executive producer alongside Jamie Tarses and Julia Franz, and the production companies, Sony Pictures Television and FanFare Productions. On August 26, 2011, TBS placed a pilot order for Men at Work.

In September 2011, Danny Masterson, James Lesure, Adam Busch, and Michael Cassidy were cast as the four leads, with Masterson playing the role of Milo, the recently dumped guy whose friends try to help him get back in the dating scene; Lesure playing the role of Gibbs, a ladies' man and photographer at the magazine; Busch playing the role of Neal, a reporter at the magazine and the only one in the group with a girlfriend; and Cassidy playing the role of Tyler, a stylish feature writer. Meredith Hagner was the final addition to the cast as Amy, Neal's girlfriend whose father owns the magazine.

On January 6, 2012, TBS picked up Men at Work for a first season of 10 episodes that premiered on May 24, 2012. Production on the first season began in April 2012.

On August 20, 2013, TBS picked up Men at Work for a third season of 10 episodes.  Season 3 premiered on January 15, 2014.

On May 11, 2014, TBS canceled Men at Work after three seasons.

References

External links
 
 
 Men at Work on TV.com

2010s American sex comedy television series
2010s American sitcoms
2010s American workplace comedy television series
2012 American television series debuts
2014 American television series endings
English-language television shows
TBS (American TV channel) original programming
Television series by Sony Pictures Television
Television shows filmed in California
Television shows set in New York City
Works about magazine publishing